The South Bay House of Correction is a Suffolk County jail. It was opened in 1991, replacing an earlier structure from the 1880s.

References

External links

Defunct prisons in Massachusetts
Government buildings in Boston
County government buildings in Massachusetts
Jails in Massachusetts
1991 establishments in Massachusetts